Lake Kummerow is a lake in the Mecklenburgische Seenplatte district, Mecklenburg-Vorpommern, Germany. At an elevation of 0.3 m, its surface area is 32.55 km². Its outflow is the Peene. It is situated southwest of Demmin. It is named after the village Kummerow on its southern shore.

References

External links 

 

Kummerow
LKummerow